Girdling, also called ring-barking, is the complete removal of the bark (consisting of cork cambium or "phellogen", phloem, cambium and sometimes going into the xylem) from around the  entire circumference of either a branch or trunk of a woody plant.  Girdling results in the death of the area above the girdle over time.  A branch completely girdled will fail and when the main trunk of a tree is girdled, the entire tree will die, if it cannot regrow from above to bridge the wound.  Human practices of girdling include forestry, horticulture, and vandalism.  Foresters use the practice of girdling to thin forests. Animals such as rodents will girdle trees by feeding on outer bark, often during winter under snow.  Girdling can also be caused by herbivorous mammals feeding on plant bark and by birds and insects, both of which can effectively girdle a tree by boring rows of adjacent holes.

Orchardists use girdling as a cultural technique to yield larger fruit or to set fruit. In viniculture (grape cultivation) the technique is also called cincturing.

Forestry and horticulture 

Like all vascular plants, trees use two vascular tissues for transportation of water and nutrients: the xylem (also known as the wood) and the phloem (the innermost layer of the bark). Girdling results in the removal of the phloem, and death occurs from the inability of the leaves to transport sugars (primarily sucrose) to the roots. In this process, the xylem is left untouched, and the tree can usually still temporarily transport water and minerals from the roots to the leaves. Trees normally sprout shoots below the wound; if not, the roots die. Death occurs when the roots can no longer produce ATP and transport nutrients upwards through the xylem. The formation of new shoots below the wound can be prevented by painting the wound with herbicide.

Ring barking techniques have been developed to disrupt or impede sugar transport in phloem, stimulating early flower production and increasing fruiting, and for controlling plant size, reducing the need for pruning.
  
Girdling is a slow process compared to felling and is often used only when necessary, such as in the removal of an individual tree from an ecologically protected area without damaging surrounding growth.

Accidental girdling is also possible and some activities must be performed with care. Saplings which are tied to a supporting stake may unintentionally be girdled as they grow, due to friction caused by contact with the tie. If ropes are tied frequently to a tree (e.g. to tether an animal or moor a boat), the friction of the rope can also lead to the removal of bark.

The practice of girdling has been known in Europe for some time. Another example is the girdling of selected Douglas-fir trees in some Northern California oak woodlands, such as Annadel State Park, in order to prevent that Douglas-fir from massive invasion of the mixed oak woodland. 

Girdling can be used to create standing dead wood, or snags. This can provide a valuable habitat for a variety of wildlife, including insects and nesting birds.

Horticulture

Girdling is also used as a technique to force a fruit-bearing plant to bear larger fruit.  A farmer would place a girdle (bark removal) at base of a large branch or at the trunk.  Thus, all sugars manufactured by the leaves have no sinks but the fruit, which grows to above the normal size.  For grapes girdling or cincturing is used to make the grapes large and sweeter on the grape canopy and are sold as girdled grapes. Flowering and fruit setting is a problem on some trees; girdling may improve yield in the same way.  The "damage" done by girdling restricts the movement of nutrients to the roots, thus the carbohydrates produced in the leaves do not go to the roots for storage.  Girdling temporarily stops tree growth. Root pruning, an ancient Asian practice, and other controlled damaging, such as driving nails into the trunk or beating the branches and trunk, produce results that are similar to girdling.  Girdling is commonly used on grape, avocado, apple, litchi, mango, citrus and other trees.  Girdling is normally only done to healthy trees that did not yield well the previous year. Care must be used not to damage sapwood that may kill the tree or vine. Trees normally heal in four to five weeks after cincturing.  Painting the cut can protect against fungus and pests.

By animals

Various animals can girdle trees through their feeding or others activities.

In North America, voles in particular are prone to damaging trees by girdling both their roots and trunk. Among North American birds, the sapsuckers are the most common girdlers of trees. While sapsuckers will bore holes in tree trunks to feed upon insects, they also make parallel rings of holes in order to eat sap that collects in the openings or to feed it to their young. They most frequently attack pine, birch, maple, spruce and fruit trees and do the most damage during breeding season and territory establishment between February and June.

Beavers girdle the bases of stems 3-6 inches in diameter, and girdle the roots of larger trees. This often weakens or kills trees.

In the United Kingdom and other parts of Europe, the eastern grey squirrel is also known to girdle or entirely strip bark from trees.

Bucks (male deer) inadvertently girdle trees by rubbing their antlers on trees of various ages.

One of several ways rabbits damage the environment in Australia is by girdling.

By vines
Trees can be girdled by climbing, twining, and ground-creeping (rampant) vines.  There are several invasive species that harm trees in this way and cause significant damage to forest canopy and the health of ecosystems dependent on it. Oriental Bittersweet, Oriental Wisteria, and English Ivy all can damage and kill trees by girdling.

See also
Debarking (lumber)
Forest pathology
Pruning
grafting
Arborist
Coppicing
Fruit tree forms
Lopping
Pollarding
Pruning fruit trees
Topiary
Dead hedge (which can be made from pruned branches to attract insects for hibernation and pollination)
Annual growth cycle of grapevines
Propagation of grapevines
List of animals referred to as girdled

References

External links
Girdling Effects 

Forestry
Horticulture